Bernardo Davanzati (1529 – 1606) was an Italian agronomist, economist and translator.

Davanzati was major translator of Tacitus. He also attempted the concision of Tacitus in his own Italian prose, taking a motto Strictius Arctius reflecting his ambition.

He wrote on economics as a metallist. His works included Notizie dei cambi (1582) and Lezione delle monete (1588). 

His Scisma d'Inghilterra was first published in 1602 in Rome. It was a concise version of a work of Girolamo Pollini, on the English Reformation, which itself was dependent on a Latin work of 1585 written by Nicholas Sander and Edward Rishton. John Milton used its imprimaturs (from the 1638 edition) as an illustration on his Areopagitica.

Notes

External links
 treccani.it, Davanzati, Bernardo.

1529 births
1606 deaths
Italian agronomists
Italian economists
Italian translators
Writers from Florence
Italian Renaissance people
Latin–Italian translators
16th-century translators
16th-century Italian writers
16th-century male writers